Lycée Français de Djibouti (LFD) is a French international school with two campuses in Djibouti, the Dolto and Kessel campuses. It was founded when the École française Françoise Dolto and the Lycée Français Joseph Kessel, respectively founded in 1978 and 1991, merged on 27 April 2007. The school serves up to the lycée (senior high school) level.

References

External links
 Lycée Français de Djibouti

International schools in Djibouti
French international schools in Africa